Church of the Friendly Ghost aka COTFG is a volunteer-run arts organization supporting creative expression and counter-culture community. COTFG activities may include experiments in sound composition, custom made electronics, improvisation, cross-genre collaborations, site-specific performances, and future-minded creative music.

Conception 
Church of the Friendly Ghost, currently known as COTFG was originally established in the fall of 2003 when a group of friends began hosting performances and other artistic activities in a small former church building at 209 Pedernales Street in Austin, Texas. Over the years, the organization has presented over one thousand events. In 2007, COTFG became a sponsored project of Salvage Vanguard Theater, a tax-exempt, non-profit organization. Also in 2007, the organization re-located to a performance space on Manor Rd. In June 2016, COTFG held their final performance in the Salvage Vanguard Theater building and has since then continued to create numerous site-specific performances around the city of Austin.

New Media Art & Sound Summit aka NMASS 
In 2009, COTFG created a festival, originally called the Modern Aural Sculpture Symposium South, to provide opportunities to explore music through workshops, lectures on compositional techniques, improvisation demonstrations, interviews with musicians, art installations, experimental musics, and performances of local artists at both the festival location and throughout the city of Austin. In 2010, COTFG expanded the festival into a three-day event and renamed it the New Media Art and Sound Summit, or the "NMASS Fest." The yearly festival emphasizes collaboration and creation with the intention of attracting attention to Austin's creative community.

NMASS Fest and the COTFG series of performances are made possible by community patrons, and through their partnership with Salvage Vanguard Theater COTFG is also funded and supported in part by the City of Austin through the Cultural Arts Division.

Recognition 
 City of Austin Cultural Arts Division Cultural Contact (since 2008)
 Met Life Arts
 Austin Chronicle - "Best Of"

References

External links
Website
Festival Website
Social Media
Social Media
Social Media

Sources
Article about New Media Art and Sound Summit in Austin Culture Map
Austinist article 2012
Austinist article 2010
Austin Chronicle Article: Sounds of the City 2009
Austin Chronicle Article: Culture Club 2009
Austin Chronicle Best of 2009
Interview with Aaron Mace 2008
Austin Chronicle Article: Spectres 2008
Austin Chronicle Article: TCB August 2005
Austin Chronicle Article: TCB May 2005

Organizations based in Austin, Texas